Rik Van Linden (born 28 July 1949 in Wilrijk, Antwerp) is a Belgian former road bicycle racer. He won the points classification in the 1975 Tour de France, ahead of Eddy Merckx.

Van Linden also won several stages in all of the three Grand Tours, and the classic cycle race Paris–Tours twice (1971, 1973).

Through his career, he eventually won 359 races, of which 73 as junior cyclist in 1968.

Major results

Road 

1968
 1st  Road race, National Junior Road Championships
1969
 1st Ronde van Vlaanderen Beloften
1970
 1st  Omnium, National Amateur Track Championships
1971
 1st Paris–Tours
 2nd Kampioenschap van Vlaanderen
 2nd Omloop der Zennevallei
 3rd GP di Larciano
 8th Trofeo Matteotti
 9th Scheldeprijs
1972
 Tour de France
 1st Stage 2 
 2nd Points Classification
 1st Stage 5a Tirreno–Adriatico
 3rd GP van Malderen 
 8th Paris–Tours
 9th Amstel Gold Race 
 10th Brussel-Ingooigem
1973
 1st Paris–Tours
 Giro d'Italia
 1st Stages 7 & 17
 Paris–Nice
 1st Stages 2, 3b (TTT), 5 & 5a
Tour of Belgium
 1st Prologue (TTT)
 Giro di Sardegna
 1st Stages 1, 2 & 4b 
 1st Puivelde Koerse
 2nd Grand Prix Pino Cerami
 3rd Overall Vuelta a Andalucía
 1st Prologue & Stages 1, 4 & 6 
 3rd Paris–Brussels
 4th Milan–San Remo
 10th E3 Harelbeke
1974
 1st  Overall Giro di Sardegna
 Vuelta a España
 1st Stages 3 & 4
 10th Overall Paris–Nice
 1st  Points Classification
 1st Stage 7a 
 1st Omloop der Zuid-West-Vlaamse Bergen
 2nd Grote Prijs Jef Scherens
 2nd Omloop Schelde-Durme
 3rd Omloop Het Volk
 3rd Grand Prix Pino Cerami
 3rd GP van Malderen 
 5th Scheldeprijs
 6th Grand Prix of Aargau Canton
 7th Tour of Flanders
 7th Kampioenschap van Vlaanderen
 8th Paris–Tours
 9th Road race, National Road Championships
1975
 Tour de France
 1st  Points classification
 1st Stages 1b, 19 & 21
 1st Milano–Vignola
 1st Stage 5 Giro d'Italia
 1st Stage 3a Setmana Catalana de Ciclisme
 1st GP Union Dortmund
 2nd Grand Prix Pino Cerami
 3rd Gent–Wevelgem
 3rd Dwars door West-Vlaanderen
 5th Tour of Flanders
 7th Brabantse Pijl
1976
 1st Milano–Vignola
 1st Giro di Campania
 1st Stage 5a Tirreno–Adriatico
 1st Stage 1 Giro di Puglia
 Giro d'Italia
 1st Stages 3 & 15 
 1st :nl:Memorial Fred De Bruyne
 2nd Gent–Wevelgem
 6th Milan–San Remo
 6th Rund um den Henninger Turm
1977
 1st Milano–Torino
 1st Stage 2a Giro d'Italia
 1st Stage 4 Tirreno–Adriatico
 1st Circuit de Niel 
 2nd Overall Giro di Sardegna
 1st Stage 4
 2nd Acht van Chaam 
 2nd Ronde van Limburg
 2nd Maaslandse Pijl
 4th Milan–San Remo
1978 
 1st Milano–Vignola
 1st Stage 5a Tirreno–Adriatico
 10th Overall Giro d'Italia
 1st Stages 1, 5 & 6 
Giro di Puglia
 1st Stage 3
 5th Milan–San Remo
 7th Gent–Wevelgem
1979
 3rd Grand Prix Pino Cerami
 7th Overall Giro di Puglia
1980
 1st Stage 7a Paris–Nice
2nd Grand Prix de Cannes
 3rd E3 Prijs Vlaanderen
1981
 1st Ruddervoorde Koerse
2nd Omloop van Neeroeteren
 10th Le Samyn
1982 
 3rd Milano–Torino

Track 

1969
3rd National Track Championships Juniors, Omnium
1970
1st  National Track Championships Amateurs, Omnium
1972
 2nd Six Days of Antwerp with (Patrick Sercu and Alain van Lancker)
3rd  National Track Championships, Madison (with Norbert Seeuws)
1973
2nd  National Track Championships, Derny
3rd  European Track Championships – Madison (with Julien Stevens)
1974
2nd  National Track Championships, Madison (with Julien Stevens)
 2nd Six Days of Antwerp (with René Pijnen)
1975
2nd  National Track Championships, Madison (with Julien Stevens)
1976
National Track Championships
2nd  Madison (with Dirk Baert)
3rd  Omnium
3rd  Derny
 2nd Six Days of Milan (with Felice Gimondi)
 3rd Six Days of Antwerp (with Graeme Gilmore)
1977
2nd  National Track Championships, Derny
 1st Six Days of Milan (with Felice Gimondi)
 3rd Six Days of Antwerp (with René Pijnen)
1978
National Track Championships
1st  Derny
1979
National Track Championships
1st  Derny
 2nd Six Days of Antwerp (with Patrick Sercu and Roger De Vlaeminck)

External links

Official Tour de France results for Rik Van Linden

1949 births
Belgian male cyclists
Living people
Belgian Tour de France stage winners
Belgian Giro d'Italia stage winners
Belgian Vuelta a España stage winners
People from Wilrijk
Cyclists from Antwerp